The San Elizario Spy Company or Coopwood Spy Company was an independent volunteer company of cavalry formed by Captain Bethel Coopwood and mustered into Confederate service on July 11, 1861 in El Paso, Texas.

Organization
The company had four officers, eight NCOs and 36 personnel, some from California but most from the El Paso area.  By the time it was attached to John R. Baylor Command in Mesilla, New Mexico on October 3, 1861 it had 61 enlisted personnel, the additional men recruited in the Mesilla area. On January 25, 1862 two NCOs and seven privates from the Company were detached to help form Sherod Hunter's Company A, Arizona Rangers, that were sent to occupy Tucson, Arizona.

Service
The Company served in the Army of New Mexico during the New Mexico Campaign and fought in the Battle of Valverde, Battle of Glorieta Pass and the Battle of Peralta.

See also
Texas Civil War Confederate Units
Texas in the American Civil War

Notes

References
 Hall, Martin Hardwick & Long, Sam. The Confederate Army of New Mexico. Austin, TX: Presidial Press, 1978. Information on Baylor's activities in New Mexico and on Bethel Coopwood. Includes roster of members of Coopwood's San Elizario Spy Company (said to be mostly Californians & Arizonians).

External links
 Confederate 4th Corporal Enrique B. D'Hamel San Elizario Spy Company of El Paso, Texas Confederate Army of New Mexico
Confederate Enrique B. D'Hamel, 1864

Units and formations of the Confederate States Army from Texas
Cavalry units and formations
1861 establishments in Texas